Nicolás Capaldo Taboas (born 14 September 1998) is an Argentine professional footballer who plays as a midfielder for Austrian Bundesliga club Red Bull Salzburg.

Club career
Capaldo is a product of the Boca Juniors academy, he had been signed from Deportivo Mac Allister in 2015. Gustavo Alfaro called the midfielder up in 2019, initially for the mid-season break where he featured in a Torneo de Verano friendly with Unión Santa Fe on 16 January. After not being used while on the substitutes bench for away fixtures with San Martín and Belgrano, Capaldo made his debut in professional football during a Primera División match against Defensa y Justicia on 24 February at the Estadio Norberto "Tito" Tomaghello.

International career
In September 2019, Capaldo was called up by the Argentina U23s ahead of an exhibition fixture with Bolivia. He played his first match a few days later against Colombia, and scored his first goal for the team against Brazil in a 1–0 win for the Gran Canaria invitational tournament final.

Career statistics
.

Honours
Boca Juniors
Primera División: 2019–20
Copa Argentina: 2019–20
Copa de la Liga Profesional: 2020

Red Bull Salzburg
Bundesliga: 2022
Austrian Cup: 2022

Argentina U23
Pre-Olympic Tournament: 2020

References

External links

1998 births
Living people
People from Santa Rosa, La Pampa
Argentine people of Italian descent
Argentine footballers
Association football midfielders
Boca Juniors footballers
FC Red Bull Salzburg players
Argentine Primera División players
Austrian Football Bundesliga players
Argentine expatriate footballers
Expatriate footballers in Austria